This is a list of the most powerful wind turbines. The list includes wind turbines with a power rating that is within 5 MW of the current most powerful wind turbine that has received customer orders that is at least at the prototype stage. All the most powerful turbines are offshore wind turbines. This list also includes the most powerful onshore wind turbines, although they are relatively small compared to the largest offshore ones.

As of January 2022, the most powerful wind turbine that has received customer orders that is at least at the prototype stage is the 14 MW GE Haliade-X.

See also 

Østerild Wind Turbine Test Field, test site of several prototypes

References 

Electric power-related lists
Environmental technology
Lists related to renewable energy
Renewable electricity
Renewable energy commercialization
Wind turbines
Lists of superlatives